The 23rd Street station is a local station on the IRT Lexington Avenue Line of the New York City Subway. Located at the intersection of Park Avenue South and 23rd Street in Gramercy Park and Flatiron District, Manhattan, it is served by  trains at all times, <6> trains during weekdays in the peak direction, and  trains during late night hours.

The 23rd Street station was constructed for the Interborough Rapid Transit Company (IRT) as part of the city's first subway line, which was approved in 1900. Construction of the line segment that includes the 23rd Street station started on September 12 of the same year. The station opened on October 27, 1904, as one of the original 28 stations of the New York City Subway. The station's platforms were lengthened in the late 1940s.

The 23rd Street station contains two side platforms and four tracks; express trains use the inner two tracks to bypass the station. The station was built with tile and mosaic decorations, which are continued along the platform extensions. The platforms contain exits to 22nd Street to the south and 23rd Street to the north. The platforms are not connected to each other within fare control. The station contains elevators from the street, which make it compliant with the Americans with Disabilities Act of 1990.

History

Construction and opening 

Planning for a subway line in New York City dates to 1864. However, development of what would become the city's first subway line did not start until 1894, when the New York State Legislature authorized the Rapid Transit Act. The subway plans were drawn up by a team of engineers led by William Barclay Parsons, chief engineer of the Rapid Transit Commission. It called for a subway line from New York City Hall in lower Manhattan to the Upper West Side, where two branches would lead north into the Bronx. A plan was formally adopted in 1897, and all legal conflicts concerning the route alignment were resolved near the end of 1899. The Rapid Transit Construction Company, organized by John B. McDonald and funded by August Belmont Jr., signed the initial Contract 1 with the Rapid Transit Commission in February 1900, in which it would construct the subway and maintain a 50-year operating lease from the opening of the line. In 1901, the firm of Heins & LaFarge was hired to design the underground stations. Belmont incorporated the Interborough Rapid Transit Company (IRT) in April 1902 to operate the subway.

The 23rd Street station was constructed as part of the route segment from Great Jones Street to 41st Street. Construction on this section of the line began on September 12, 1900. The section from Great Jones Street to a point 100 feet (30 m) north of 33rd Street was awarded to Holbrook, Cabot & Daly Contracting Company, while the remaining section to 41st Street was done by Ira A. Shaker. By late 1903, the subway was nearly complete, but the IRT Powerhouse and the system's electrical substations were still under construction, delaying the system's opening. The 23rd Street station opened on October 27, 1904, as one of the original 28 stations of the New York City Subway from City Hall to 145th Street on the Broadway–Seventh Avenue Line.

Service changes and station renovations 
After the first subway line was completed in 1908, the station was served by local trains along both the West Side (now the Broadway–Seventh Avenue Line to Van Cortlandt Park–242nd Street) and East Side (now the Lenox Avenue Line). West Side local trains had their southern terminus at City Hall during rush hours and South Ferry at other times, and had their northern terminus at 242nd Street. East Side local trains ran from City Hall to Lenox Avenue (145th Street).

To address overcrowding, in 1909, the New York Public Service Commission proposed lengthening platforms at stations along the original IRT subway. As part of a modification to the IRT's construction contracts, made on January 18, 1910, the company was to lengthen station platforms to accommodate ten-car express and six-car local trains. In addition to $1.5 million (equivalent to $ million in ) spent on platform lengthening, $500,000 was spent on building additional entrances and exits. It was anticipated that these improvements would increase capacity by 25 percent. Both platforms were extended to the north and south. Six-car local trains began operating in October 1910. The Lexington Avenue Line opened north of Grand Central–42nd Street in 1918, thereby dividing the original line into an "H"-shaped system. All local trains were sent via the Lexington Avenue Line, running along the Pelham Line in the Bronx. 

In December 1922, the Transit Commission approved a $3 million project to lengthen platforms at 14 local stations along the original IRT line, including 23rd Street and seven other stations on the Lexington Avenue Line. The commission postponed the platform-lengthening project in September 1923, at which point the cost had risen to $5.6 million.

The city government took over the IRT's operations on June 12, 1940. On April 13, 1948, the platform extensions to accommodate ten-car trains at this station, along with those at 28th Street, and 33rd Street, were opened for use.

In 1981, the MTA listed the station among the 69 most deteriorated stations in the subway system.

In late 2014, construction began to install ADA-accessible elevators in the station. To make room for the elevator that serves the northbound platform, the northbound staircase on the northeastern corner of Park Avenue South and 23rd Street had to be demolished, and was relocated a few feet down the street. The relocated staircase opened in August 2015. The construction was completed in December 2016, making the station fully ADA-compliant.

Station layout 

Like other local stations, 23rd Street has four tracks and two side platforms. The 6 stops here at all times, rush-hour and midday <6> trains stop here in the peak direction; and the 4 stops here during late nights. The two express tracks are used by the 4 and 5 trains during daytime hours. The platform extensions are at the south ends of the original platforms. The 23rd Street station is fully wheelchair-accessible, with elevators connecting the street and platforms.

Design

As with other stations built as part of the original IRT, the station was constructed using a cut-and-cover method. The tunnel is covered by a "U"-shaped trough that contains utility pipes and wires. Each platform consists of  concrete slabs, beneath which are drainage basins. The platforms contain columns with white glazed tiles, spaced every . Additional columns between the tracks, spaced every , support the jack-arched concrete station roofs. There is a  gap between the trough wall and the platform walls, which are made of -thick brick covered over by a tiled finish.

The original decorative scheme consisted of black tile station-name tablets, violet and white tile bands, a grey faience cornice, blue faience plaques, and marble wainscoting. The mosaic tiles at all original IRT stations were manufactured by the American Encaustic Tile Company, which subcontracted the installations at each station. The decorative work was performed by tile contractor Manhattan Glass Tile Company and faience contractor Rookwood Pottery Company. The ceilings of the original platforms and fare control areas contain plaster molding.

There are no open crossovers or crossunders between the platforms. The platform extensions had beige tiles. During station renovations in 1988, the beige tiles were removed and the original, white ones restored. It has IND-style signs indicating the way to the exits at 22nd and 23rd Streets. An ornate fare control grille on the southbound side is a piece of artwork entitled Long Division by artist Valerie Jaudon, which was installed during the renovation. The station features a back-lit "23 Street/Park Avenue South" sign at the platform level fare control. The station does not contain restrooms.

Exits
Each platform has exits to both 22nd and 23rd Streets; the northbound platform's exits are on the eastern side of Park Avenue South while the southbound platform's exits are on the western side. At 23rd Street, each control area contains two stairs to the southern side of 23rd Street, and a stair and an elevator to the northern side. The northwestern corner stair, for the southbound platform, is within the One Madison Avenue office tower and contains a passageway into the basement of the same building. The elevators provide ADA-accessibility for the whole station.

At 22nd Street, each control area contains two exits, one each to the north and south sides of that street. The southwestern corner stair, for the southbound platform, is inside a building. The northeastern corner stair is outside the United Charities Building and the southeastern corner stair is outside the Church Missions House.

When the station was built, the IRT had made an agreement to construct an exit from the southbound platform into the Mercantile Building (now 304 Park Avenue South), at the southwestern corner of 23rd Street and Park Avenue South. The passageway was slightly higher than the southbound platform, so a broad, curved flight of stairs was built on the southern side of the southbound fare control area. There were store windows on the southern side of the passageway, overlooking the Mercantile Building's basement storefront. When opened, the passageway was advertised as New York City's first underground sidewalk. While the broad flight of stairs still exists, the passageway has been sealed. Another sealed passageway leads from the northbound platform to the lobby of 303 Park Avenue South, at the northeast corner with 23rd Street.

In popular culture
In the 1998 film Godzilla, this station was destroyed by Zilla and used as the entrance to the nesting ground inside Madison Square Garden.

Notes

References

External links 

 
 Station Reporter — 6 Train
 Forgotten NY — Original 28 - NYC's First 28 Subway Stations
 MTA's Arts For Transit — 23rd Street (IRT Lexington Avenue Line)
 23rd Street entrance from Google Maps Street View
 22nd Street entrance from Google Maps Street View
 Platforms from Google Maps Street View

IRT Lexington Avenue Line stations
New York City Subway stations in Manhattan
Railway stations in the United States opened in 1904
1904 establishments in New York City

Rose Hill, Manhattan
23rd Street (Manhattan)